IFK Falköping FF is a Swedish football club located in Falköping in Falköping Municipality, Västra Götaland County.

Background
IFK Falköping is a sports club from Falköping that was founded in 1921 under the name Falköpings BK. The name was changed to IFK Falköping in 1925.  The club runs sections covering table tennis, football and ice-hockey and previously provided for bandy.  The club originally comprised a main board representing the various sections but at the AGM in 1988 was transformed into an alliance of clubs.

Since their foundation IFK Falköping FF has participated mainly in the middle and lower divisions of the Swedish football league system.  In their early years the club played in the Skaraborgsserien and Västgötaserien. A notable Division 3 match was in 1957 when IFK Falköping lost to Tidaholms GIF in front of 2,291 spectators. In 1974 the club played at their highest level for one season in Division 2 Södra which at that time was the second tier of Swedish football. The club currently plays in Division 3 Mellersta Götaland which is the fifth tier of Swedish football but have finished in a relegation position. They play their home matches at the Odenplan in Falköping.

IFK Falköping FF are affiliated to the Västergötlands Fotbollförbund.

Season to season

Attendances

In recent seasons IFK Falköping FF have had the following average attendances:

Footnotes

External links
 Falköping FF – Official website

Football clubs in Västra Götaland County
Association football clubs established in 1921
Bandy clubs established in 1921
1921 establishments in Sweden
Idrottsföreningen Kamraterna